A bonfire is a large, controlled outdoor fire. It may also refer to:

Music
Bonfire (band), a German heavy metal band
Bonfire (album), a 5 disc box set by the Australian band AC/DC
"Bonfire" (Craig Morgan song), 2009
"Bonfire" (Childish Gambino song), 2011
Bonfire (Felix Jaehn song), 2016
"Bonfire", a song by Third Eye Blind from Ursa Major
 "Bonfire", a track by Knife Party from Rage Valley

Video games
Bonfire Studios, a video game company in Dallas, Texas
Bonfire (Dark Souls), a type of checkpoint in the Dark Souls series

Other
Bonfire Snowboarding, a manufacturer of snowboarding outerwear
Aggie Bonfire, a tradition at Texas A&M University
Bonfire (horse), a prizewinning dressage horse ridden by the Dutch equestrian Anky van Grunsven

See also

 Campfire (disambiguation)
 Campfire Songs (disambiguation)